Research Studies in Music Education is a peer-reviewed academic journal that publishes papers twice a year in the field of Music Education. The journal's editor is Julie Ballantyne (University of Queensland). It has been in publication since 1993 and is currently published by SAGE Publications on behalf of Society for Education, Music and Psychology Research.

Scope 
Research Studies in Music Education provides a forum for the dissemination and discussion of research in music and music education. The journal aims to encourage the interrogation and development of a range of research methodologies and their application to diverse topics in music education, theory and practice.

Abstracting and indexing 
Research Studies in Music Education is abstracted and indexed in the following databases:
 Australian Education Index
 Educational Research Abstracts Online
 ERIC
 IBZ: International Bibliography of Periodical Literature
 PsycINFO
 SCOPUS

External links 
 
 

SAGE Publishing academic journals
English-language journals
Music education organizations